Corbin Bridge, also known as Huntingdon County Bridge No. 20, is a historic suspension bridge spanning the Raystown Branch Juniata River and located at Juniata Township, Huntingdon County, Pennsylvania.  It was built by the Reading Steel Products Inc. in 1937.  It measures  and has a  deck.  It is the only road suspension bridge in Huntingdon County.

It was added to the National Register of Historic Places in 1990.

See also
List of bridges documented by the Historic American Engineering Record in Pennsylvania

References

External links

Road bridges on the National Register of Historic Places in Pennsylvania
Bridges completed in 1937
Bridges in Huntingdon County, Pennsylvania
Historic American Engineering Record in Pennsylvania
Suspension bridges in Pennsylvania
National Register of Historic Places in Huntingdon County, Pennsylvania
Steel bridges in the United States